Revengers Tragedy is a 2003 album by Chumbawamba which served as the soundtrack to the 2003 film adaptation of the 1606 play The Revenger's Tragedy.

Track listing
All songs written and produced by Chumbawamba

 Liverpool: Drive with Care - 5:13
 He Did Assault My Brother! - 3:23
 That Eternal Eye - 1:36
 The Very Core of Lust - 2:17
 Villain! Strumpet! Slapper! - 2:17
 Blurred - 1:50
 Lullaby Demons - 4:04
 A Slavish Duke Is Baser Than His Slaves - 3:11
 Sweet Angel of Revenge 5:06
 Ambition - 5:42
 Don't Try This at Home (Revengers Version) 3:28

References

Chumbawamba albums
2003 soundtrack albums
Comedy-drama film soundtracks